Dragan Ćeran (Serbian Cyrillic: Драган Ћеран; born 6 October 1987) is a Serbian football striker who plays for Pakhtakor Tashkent.

Previously he played for Smederevo in the Serbian SuperLiga.

Club career
In August 2013, Ćeran signed for Azerbaijan Premier League side Simurq. Ćeran made his debut for Simurq in their second game of the season, away to Khazar Lankaran on 11 August 2013, coming on as an 84th-minute substitute for Salif Ballo. Ćeran's first goal for Simurq came in the 78th minute of their 2–1 victory against Inter Baku on 1 September 2013. Ćeran signed a new one-year contract with Simurq on 31 May 2014, turning down offers from Dordrecht, Levadiakos and Viborg FF.

In 2016 he moved to Uzbekistan, where he first played for the Nasaf, and in the middle of the 2018 season he moved to the capital Pakhtakor, where he later became the leader of the team's attacks.

In 2019, he became the top scorer of the championship of Uzbekistan, scoring 23 goals, and was also recognized as the best football player of the Uzbekistan Super League.

International career
In 2006, Ćeran received his first call up to the Serbia national under-21 team.

Career statistics

Honours

Club
Vardar
Macedonian First League: 2015–16
Nasaf
 Uzbekistan Cup runner-up: 2017
Pakhtakor Tashkent
 Uzbekistan Super League (4): 2019, 2020, 2021, 2022
 Uzbekistan Cup (2): 2019, 2020; runner-up: 2018, 2021
 Uzbekistan Super Cup (2): 2021, 2022
 Uzbekistan League Cup: 2019

Individual
 Azerbaijan Premier League Top Scorer: 2014–15
 Uzbekistan Super League Top Scorer (4): 2019, 2020, 2021, 2022

References

External links
 Dragan Ćeran Stats at Utakmica.rs
 

1987 births
Living people
Serbian footballers
Serbia under-21 international footballers
Serbian expatriate footballers
FK Smederevo players
Serbian SuperLiga players
Hapoel Haifa F.C. players
Israeli Premier League players
Association football forwards
Maccabi Netanya F.C. players
Simurq PIK players
Expatriate footballers in Israel
Expatriate footballers in Azerbaijan
Sportspeople from Kikinda
Hajer FC players
FK Vardar players
Saudi Professional League players
Uzbekistan Super League players
Expatriate footballers in Uzbekistan
Serbian expatriate sportspeople in Uzbekistan